Manuel Royes (1924 – 7 February 2016) was a Spanish field hockey player. He competed in the men's tournament at the 1948 Summer Olympics.

References

External links
 

1924 births
2016 deaths
Spanish male field hockey players
Olympic field hockey players of Spain
Field hockey players at the 1948 Summer Olympics
Place of birth missing